The Rodło is a Polish emblem used since 1932 by the Union of Poles in Germany. It is a stylized representation of the Vistula River and Kraków as the wellsprings of Polish culture.

History

 
After Adolf Hitler had seized power in Germany, Nazi emblems were soon nationalized. The swastika became national emblem of the Third Reich and Poles from the Union of Poles in Germany could not use their national symbols anymore, because they were prohibited.  Dr. Jan Kaczmarek approached the supreme council with the following proposal: 

The Rodło was invented as a new symbol around which Poles in Germany could rally. The name "rodło" is a portmanteau of "ród" ("folk") and "godło" ("emblem").

The Rodło graphics was conceived in the 1930s by graphic designer Janina Kłopocka, who sketched the "emblem of the Vistula River, cradle of the Polish people, and royal Kraków, cradle of Polish culture". The white emblem was placed on a red background, the Polish national colors. It was adopted in August 1932 by the leadership of the Union of Poles in Germany.

Other uses

The Rodło has since been adopted by other organizations of Poles in Germany, notably the Scouts, who have used it alongside the fleur de lys. After the World War II it was also used by organizations working in Poland, on the territories gained from Germany as the result of war.

In 1985 the People's Republic of Poland introduced a Rodło Medal. In 1992, after the fall of communism, it was discontinued.

Bibliography
  Helena Lehr, Edmund Osmańczyk. Polacy spod znaku Rodła. MON, Warszawa 1972
 Edmund Osmańczyk. Niezłomny proboszcz z Zakrzewa, rzecz o Księdzu Patronie Bolesławie Domańskim. Warszawa 1989, 
 Edmund Osmańczyk. Wisła i Kraków to Rodło. Nasza Księgarnia, Warszawa 1985, 
 W Wrzesiński. Polski ruch narodowy w Niemczech w latach 1922-1939. Ossolineum 1993
 Bogusław Czajkowski. Rodło. KAW, Warszawa 1975

See also
 History of Poland

References

National symbols of Poland
Scouting and Guiding in Poland